Amy Aniobi is a Nigerian-American writer and producer. She is the head writer and co-executive producer of Insecure and was also an executive producer for the HBO special 2 Dope Queens. Aniobi signed a two-year overall deal with HBO in 2019.

Life and career 
Aniobi was raised in north Texas, the daughter of Nigerian immigrants. She developed her interest in writing during her college years. Aniobi received her bachelor's degree in American Studies from Stanford University.

She is the head writer for HBO's Insecure, as well as an executive producer. She is a long-time collaborator of creator Issa Rae, a fellow student from Stanford. Aniobi was a writer for Rae's web series The Misadventures of Awkward Black Girl. She is also an executive producer for another HBO series, 2 Dope Queens.

Aniobi signed a two-year overall deal with HBO in 2019. As a part of that deal, she is writing the limited series The Dolls with Issa Rae and Laura Kittrell. She is also developing the comedy series Attachment with Reese Witherspoon and Melanie Chandra.

Aniobi is also developing film content, and forthcoming films include American Princess for Fox, and two productions for Universal Pictures, Bye Bye Bye and Love in America. She and Rae are co-producers for Love In America, a musical comedy feature. Aniobi is co-writing the screenplay with Khiyon Hursey and Harrison Richlin.

In 2021, Aniobi created a networking program called Tribe, that provides screenwriter skillsharing and professional development information for entertainment industry professionals.

She is an executive producer for Enjoy Your Meal, an upcoming workplace comedy series based in part on the allegations of institutional racism at Bon Appétit that emerged in June 2020. She most recently launched her production company SuperSpecial, and renewed her overall deal with HBO Max. In 2022 it was announced that Aniobi will develop a television series adaptation for the forthcoming novel The Nigerwife by Vanessa Walters.

Awards and nominations 
 2019 – OkayAfrica, 100 Women

References

External links 
 Official website

Year of birth missing (living people)
Living people
21st-century American women writers
American women screenwriters
American women film producers
American women television writers
American people of Nigerian descent
Stanford University alumni
Writers from Texas
HBO people